Gabriel Medina Pinto Ferreira (born 22 December 1993) is a Brazilian professional surfer who won the 2014, 2018 and 2021 WSL World Championships. With 17 WSL Championship Tour (CT) event wins and 29 Final appearances under his belt, Medina is one of the most experienced surfers when it comes to producing the best surfing under pressure. Medina is 2nd only to Kelly Slater for the most World Titles among surfers currently on the CT.

At home in Brazil, the goofy-footer is considered a national hero thanks to the World Titles he delivered. 
His explosive repertoire of above-the-lip maneuvers earned him several amateur titles in his early teens, including Rip Curl’s Grom Search, Quiksilver’s King of the Groms, and several National titles. In 2009, a 15-year-old Medina became the youngest surfer ever to win a major Qualifying Series event. Medina joined the world's elite of the World Surf League Tour in 2011 at 17 years of age (alongside eventual rival John John Florence), and in his rookie year he finished within the top 12 of the ASP (now WSL) World Tour. His high-flying acrobatic approach and his impact on the international stage poured fuel on the fledgling Brazilian Storm, a fresh injection of like-minded young professional surfers from Brazil who now occupy one-third of the CT roster. Since 2015, Medina has earned more Championship Tour victories than any other competitor and his dominance on has turned him into a perennial World Title contender. Media sources credit him as being the second person to have executed a maneuver called the "Backflip". Medina also became the first person ever to land this move in competition, held in Rio de Janeiro - Brasil.

Life and career
Born in São Sebastião, São Paulo, and raised in the city's district of Maresias, is the son of Simone Pinto Medina and Claudio de Jesus Ferreira. Medina began surfing at age nine and at 11 won his first national championship—the Rip Curl Grom Search in the category Sub-12, held in Búzios, Rio de Janeiro.

Medina won many Brazilian amateur championships, becoming champion at the Volcom Sub-14, Quicksilver King of Groms, and Rip Curl Grom Search, besides conquering the state championship three times. In California, he was second at the Volcom Internacional Sub-14, and in Ecuador, vice-champion of the Amateur World Sub-16 Championship. At 14 years old, Medina was already at the finals of the Paulista Championship, became the Paulista Junior Champion, and surfing the World Qualifying Series (WQS) 6-star event Onbongo Pro Surfing 2008 in Ubatuba, where he managed to defeat his idol Adriano de Souza, aka Mineirinho.

In July 2009, Medina won a contract with Rip Curl and endeavored to pursue a professional surfing career after that. Just ten days later, Medina set a new mark as the youngest male winner of an open-age pro competition by taking out the Maresias Surf International in Brazil by the age of 15 (That victory broke one of pro surfing's longest-standing records, held by Australian Nick Wood, who won the 1987 Rip Curl Pro at Bells Beach as a 16-year-old).

In 2011 came the sequence of championships that took Medina to share the waves with the top surfers, surfing the WQS 6 Star Prime in Imbituba, and the two WQS 6 Star in France and Spain. He was also victorious in the Pro Junior World Championship in French waves. With his prowess and results in such a young age, Medina signed an extension contract with Rip Curl just in the same week of his debut on the 2011 ASP World Championship Tour, by the age of 17, by the mid-season rotation. Medina went on to finish his rookie season with two WCT events wins (Hossegor, France and San Francisco, USA), despite competing for only half of the season.
 
In 2013, Medina went on to win the World Junior Tour (ASP) in 2013 at age 19.

In the 2014 WCT season, by winning the very first event of the season, the Quiksilver Pro Gold Coast, Medina became the first Brazilian male surfer ever to win on the Gold Coast, and also the first goofy to win this contest since 2004 and less than two months after recovering from a broken leg injury suffered while surfing in Hawaii. He dropped to 5th on the rankings after finishing 13th on the Billabong Rio Pro, but re-assumed the pole after winning the Volcom Fiji Pro. Medina also won the Billabong Pro Teahupoo, the seventh WCT event of the season in Tahiti, beating in a highly competitive final Kelly Slater. Later in the year, after finishing in 2nd place in the last event of the season at the Billabong Pipeline Masters in Hawaii, Medina went on to become the first ever Brazilian ASP World Champion by the age of 20 (the youngest since Kelly Slater did also in age 20 in 1992).

In 2015, after a sequence of average results, Medina won the Quiksilver Pro France, capturing his sixth WCT event win and his second in Hossegor, France. After beating Mick Fanning and reaching the finals at the last WCT event of the season, the Billabong Pipe Masters in Hawaii, for the second straight year, Medina once again made history, becoming the first Brazilian ever to win the Hawaiian Triple Crown of Surfing title. With Adriano de Souza winning the other semifinal later and capturing the 2015 World Title (due to Fanning's loss to Medina), the stage was set for a first time ever all Brazilian final at the Pipe Masters. Medina finished runner-up once again as de Souza became the first Brazilian ever to win the Hawaiian CT event. With this second place, Medina finished the 2015 WCT season on a high note, reaching the 3rd place.

On 14 May 2016, during the Oi Rio Pro, Medina made history once again, becoming the first surfer ever to land the move "Backflip" in competition. As a result, Medina got a perfect 10 in all five judges, thus beating fellow countryman Alex Ribeiro in a 2nd round elimination heat. Medina went on to finish the competition in third place.
On 17 June 2016, in the Fiji Islands, Medina won his seventh WCT event, his second in Cloudbreak, in heavy conditions. The win put him as the most victorious Brazilian surfer in the history of the CT only at the age of 22.

In the 2017 season, Medina made history as one of the two (Carissa Moore, in the women's division) first-ever surfers to win a competition in a man-made wave pool at Kelly Slater's Surf Ranch in Lemoore, California. 
Medina later also managed to secure two more event wins (Quiksilver Pro France and MEO Rip Curl Pro Portugal) reaching 9 WCT wins in his career, by the age of 23. Even though reaching the final event with title chances, Medina finished the season in second place. With that, Medina extends his streak of finishing the season in at least the Top 3 to an incredible four years since his 2014 world title.

In the 2018 season, Medina's better start than the previous 3 seasons and victories at Tahiti, the wave pool in California, and Pipeline  (including a 10-point ride in his quarterfinal heat) lead him onto becoming a two-time world champion, therefore becoming the most accomplished surfer from Brazil, by the age of 24. 2018 also was marked as a historic year for Brazilian surfing, as the country grabbed 9 event wins - Medina (3x), Ítalo Ferreira (3x), Filipe Toledo (2x) and William Cardoso - out of the 11 events on the 2018 Championship Tour calendar, which culminated in Medina's second world title. Also CT surfer Jessé Mendes won the Vans Triple Crown of Surfing, becoming the second Brazilian surfer to accomplish the feat, beside Medina himself. Mateus Herdy became the WSL World Junior Champion in Taiwan, joining fellow Brazilians Medina, Adriano de Souza, Caio Ibelli, Lucas Silveira and Pablo Paulino (2x), and also big wave surfers Rodrigo Koxa and Maya Gabeira winning each other the XXL Biggest Wave awards and setting new Guinness world records for largest waves surfed by a male and female surfer respectively.

In the 2019 season, after another sleepy start, Medina again claimed another win, his 13th CT event, this time in Jeffreys Bay, South Africa. Medina made history by being part of the first-ever goofy-footers final in J-Bay, against compatriot Ítalo Ferreira and also the first goofy-footer to win this event in 35 years (Mark Occhilupo), and the second ever.
On 9–15 September, Medina, along with the top surfers from all over the world, competed in Miyazaki, Japan, in the 2019 ISA World Surfing Games, a mandatory event to be eligible to compete in the 2020 Olympic Games, also to be held in Japan. Medina competed in the Open Men's division and went on to finish the event with the bronze medal, behind fellow CT surfers Kolohe Andino (2nd) and countryman Ítalo Ferreira (1st). Also, due to these results combined with Filipe Toledo's (9th after withdrawing due to back pain), and in the Open Women's division Silvana Lima's (2nd), Tatiana Weston-Webb's (5th) and Tainá Hinckel's (25th), Brazil went on to win the gold medal, the first since the 2000 ISA games.
Less than a week later, Medina captured his 14th CT event win, the third win at Kelly Slater's Surf Ranch (thus winning all three individual competitions ever had on this site at the time), in the Freshwater Pro, climbing the rankings and reaching the first position. Medina didn't do well during the European Leg and ended up eliminated in the Round of 16 in Quicksilver Pro France and MEO Rip Curl Pro Portugal. With one event left to go, he is second in the ranking, right behind Ítalo Ferreira.

Medina caused controversy in the 2019 Billabong Pipe Masters by dropping in on his fellow competitor. This led to his actions being labelled unsportsmanlike.

The Brazilian surfer was also selected to represent his country in the 2020 Tokyo Olympics alongside 2019 WCT Champion Italo Ferreira. He finished the Olympics in fourth place, narrowly losing to Australia's Owen Wright in the bronze medal match.

In the 2021 season, Medina managed to clinch his 3rd world title and did so in definitive fashion by winning 3 of the 8 tour events and placing running-up at three events as well. The win saw Medina join Tom Curren, Andy Irons and Mick Fanning with three World Titles. With 16 WSL Championship Tour (CT) event wins and 29 Final appearances under his belt, Medina is one of the most experienced surfers when it comes to producing the best surfing under pressure. Medina is 2nd only to Kelly Slater for the most World Titles among surfers currently on the CT.

In January 2022, Medina announced that he would take an indefinite leave from competitive surfing to focus on his mental health. In March, Medina underwent elective surgery to correct a deviated nasal septum. The procedure aimed to improve Medina's breathing which has been an issue for him in competition. In April, Medina announced that he would be returning to the 2022 season after having missed the first 5 CT events and was awarded the men's 2022 WSL season wildcard, which gave him entry into all CT events following the Mid-season Cut and made him eligible for the WSL Final 5 rankings and an opportunity to compete for the 2022 season title. He competed in his first 2022 season event at the Quiksilver Pro G-Land, where he placed 3rd. He also placed 3rd at his second event of the season at the El Salvador Pro. However, at his 3rd competitive event of the season at the Oi Rio Pro, Medina fell on his board and picked up an injury to his left knee, which ruled him out for the rest of the season.

Surfboards
Medina has been with his shaper Johnny Cabianca since 2008. Johnny Cabianca, a Brazilian living in the Basque Country, is one of the world's most renowned surfboard shapers. Medina is using about 100 surfboards a year, with a volume ranging from 28.5 to 29.1 litres. Cabianca who previously shaped under the Spanish label Pukas, started his own brand in 2015. Medina's first victory on a Cabianca Surfboard was the Quiksilver Pro France 2015.

In addition to his competitive quiver, Medina launched his own line of user-friendly softboards entitled "Medina Softboards" in September 2020.

Results

Victories

WSL World Championship Tour

Filmography 
Acting

 Luiza Possi: Lembra (2017)
 Surf Chronicles (2011)

Self

 Tempestade Perfeita (2021)
 É Ouro! O Brilho do Brasil em Tóquio (2021)
 World Debut (2021)
 Gabriel Medina (2020)
 WSL Men's Championship Tour (2019)
 Mundo Medina (2019)
 WSL World Surf League (2018)
 No Contest (2018)
 WSL Men's Championship Tour (2018)
 Rip Curl's The Search (2014-2017)
 WSL Men's Championship Tour (2016)
 Vai Fernandinha (2016)
 Samsung: Surf - The Snail (2016)
 WSL Men's Championship Tour (2015)
 Xuxa Meneghel (2015)
 Today (2014)
 ASP Men's Championship Tour (2014)
 ASP World Surf Tour (2014)
 Diário das Ilhas (2012)
 Noronha Prime (2012)

References

External links
 WSL profile WSL Championship Tour
 Gabriel Medina Br-Rip Curl

1993 births
Living people
Sportspeople from São Paulo (state)
Brazilian surfers
World Surf League surfers
Olympic surfers of Brazil
Surfers at the 2020 Summer Olympics